Wondong station is a railway station on the Gyeongbu Line in Won-ri, Wondong-myeon, Yangsan, South Gyeongsang, South Korea.

Mugunghwa trains stop 22 times a day (11 up and 11 down).

Originally, there were no pedestrian overpasses, but the bridge was built in the 1980s due to frequent deaths.

In spring, the Wondong Maehwa Festival is held in Wondong-myeon.

External links 
 :ko:원동역#cite note-1
Korea Transportation Corporation

Railway stations in South Gyeongsang Province